Desislav is a South Slavic masculine given name, derived from desiti meaning "to happen", and -slav, a common name component (slava) meaning "glory". It is traditionally found in Bulgaria. It may refer to:

Desislav Chukolov (born 1974), Bulgarian politician
Desislav Gunev (born 1986), Bulgarian sprinter
Desislav Rusev (born 1979), Bulgarian footballer
Desislav Stoykov (born 1992), Bulgarian

See also
Desislava, female variant of the name

Bulgarian masculine given names